Behçet Necatigil (16 April 1916 – 13 December 1979) was a leading Turkish author, poet and translator.

Biography
Behçet was born in Istanbul, Ottoman Empire, in 1916. He graduated from the Teachers' High School in Istanbul in 1940, and served as a teacher of literature at Kabatas Erkek Lisesi until the year 1972. His first poem was published in Varlık journal during his high school years in 1935. From then on, he continued to write poetry for over 40 years. Behçet is also well known for his radio dramas.

In the Şairler Sofası park in Vişnezade Istanbul there are two sculptures of him that were erected with the parks inauguration in 1998. These are an individual sculpture of him by sculptor Namık Denizhan, and the main sculpture of the park Şairler Sofası by sculptor Gürdal Duyar, in which he is featured alongside 7 other poets.

Necatigil Poetry Award
To commemorate his life, an annual poetry award was instituted in 1980. It was given on the date of Necatigil's death (13 December) until 1993 but is now given at the date of his birth, which is 16 April.www.necatigil.com.

Bibliography
Poetry
 "Kapalıçarşı" (1945)
 "Çevre" (1951)
 "Evler" (1953)
 "Eski Toprak" (1956)
 "Arada" (1958)
 "Dar Çağ" (1960)
 "Yaz Dönemi" (1963)
 "Divançe" (1965)
 "İki Başına Yürümek" (1968)
 "En/Cam" (1970)
 "Zebra" (1973)
 "Kareler Aklar" (1975)
 "Beyler" (1978)
 "Söyleriz" (1980)

Sample Poem 
IN LOVE

Love, you put off till tomorrow

Timid, reverent, tongue-tied.

Unknown you remained

To all your kin.

Through concerns never ending,   

(I know you never wanted it that way)

The feelings that welled in your heart

Never swelled

When a glance was enough to reveal everything.

You expected longer days to come

Speaking of love in minutes was ugly to you

That the years would pass in such a hurry,

In such a fuss never crossed your mind.

In your secret garden

There were flowers

blossoming at night, alone.

You regarded too trifling to give

Or somehow, you hadn’t enough time.

See also
 List of contemporary Turkish poets

References

 Biyografi.info - Biography of Behçet Necatigil 
 Biyografi.net - Biography of Behçet Necatigil

External links
 Behçet Necatigil's official website

1916 births
1979 deaths
Turkish poets
Burials at Zincirlikuyu Cemetery
20th-century poets